The Hotel Turkey is a historic hotel located in Turkey, Texas, United States that originally opened in 1927. The building was added to the National Register of Historic Places on October 24, 1991.

The two-story reddish-brown brick prairie school designed structure was built by H. B. Jordan to take advantage of the extension of the Fort Worth and Denver South Plains Railway to the town of Turkey. On June 12, 1927 the building was partially complete when a tornado leveled it. Construction resumed shortly thereafter, and Hotel Turkey opened for business in November 1927.

The hotel was located just three blocks from the train depot and provided a meeting room to the traveling salesmen of the day to display their wares to the townspeople. The hotel also became a social center for the community as dances, banquets, and meetings of social and civic organizations took place in the dining room and lobby.

The building has had several owners through the years but has operated continuously since it opened. In September 1988, Scott and Jane Johnson purchased and renovated Hotel Turkey. The hotel then had 14  patriotic, western or movie themed rooms such as the Gone With the Wind suite.

In July 2015, the Hotel Turkey was purchased and re-established by Pat and Tina Carson of Turkey. They have made numerous renovations and continue to do so.

The hotel traditionally hosts the musicians who come to Turkey for the annual Bob Wills Day celebration on the last Saturday in April. George W. Bush, while still governor of Texas, once stayed at the hotel.

See also

National Register of Historic Places listings in Hall County, Texas
Recorded Texas Historic Landmarks in Hall County

References

1927 establishments in Texas
Hotel Turkey
Hotel Turkey
Hotels established in 1927
Hotels in Texas
Hotel buildings completed in 1927
National Register of Historic Places in Hall County, Texas